Our Lady of the Flowers is an album by American jazz pianist Matthew Shipp, which was recorded in 2013 and released on the French RogueArt label. The album is named after the novel by French writer Jean Genet. It was the second disc by Shipp's Declared Enemy, the quartet he assembled for Salute to 100001 Stars with reedist Sabir Mateen, bassist William Parker and drummer Gerald Cleaver.

Reception
The All About Jazz review by John Sharpe states "Shipp propounds his utterly distinctive style, with nagging motifs prominent, though he reins in his customary explosions."

Track listing
All compositions by Matthew Shipp
 "Atomic Note" – 7:03
 "New Tension" – 5:18
 "A Different Plane" – 7:38
 "From the Beyond" – 8:27
 "Silence Blooms" – 4:24
 "Irrational" – 6:46
 "Our Lady of the Flowers" – 11:03
 "Gasp" – 7:41
 "Cosmic Joke" – 8:56

Personnel
Matthew Shipp - piano
Sabir Mateen – tenor sax, clarinet
William Parker – double bass
Gerald Cleaver – drums

References

2015 albums
Matthew Shipp albums
RogueArt albums